Joseph Djida, OMI (April 8, 1945 – January 6, 2015) was a Roman Catholic bishop.

Ordained to the priesthood in 1976, Ateba was appointed the second bishop of the Roman Catholic Diocese of Ngaoundéré, Cameroon, in 2000. He died while still in office.

Notes

1945 births
2015 deaths
21st-century Roman Catholic bishops in Cameroon
Roman Catholic bishops of Ngaoundéré
Missionary Oblates of Mary Immaculate